Siviter is an English surname of Roman origins. Notable people with the surname include:

Bethann Siviter (born 1963), British nurse
Kenneth Siviter (born 1953), British cricketer

References

English-language surnames
Surnames of Italian origin